Lancova Vas is a settlement on the left bank of the Polskava River in the Municipality of Videm in eastern Slovenia. The area traditionally belonged to the Styria region. It is now included in the Drava Statistical Region.

History
In 1989, part of the territory of Lancova Vas was separated to become a new settlement called Lancova Vas pri Ptuju.

Cultural heritage
In 2006, during construction work for a new section of a motorway, a rescue archaeological survey and partial excavations were conducted and remains of a Roman era settlement were discovered.

References

External links
Lancova Vas on Geopedia

Populated places in the Municipality of Videm